Bedřich Feuerstein (15 January 1892 – 10 May 1936) was a Czech architect, painter and essayist. 

Feuerstein was born in Dobrovice and studied at the Czech Technical University under professor Jože Plečnik. Between 1924 and 1926 he worked with Auguste Perret in Paris, and between 1929 and 1931 in Tokyo, Japan with Antonín Raymond. His work was influenced by purism and by Frank Lloyd Wright. 

After returning from Japan, Feuerstein suffered from nervous illness. His worsening condition and his financial problems led him to commit suicide in 1936, in Prague.

Important buildings:
 military geographical institute (Vojenský zeměpisný ústav) in Prague
 crematorium in Nymburk
 hospital in Tokyo, shopping center in Yokohama

References

External links

Czech Jews
Czech architects
Czech scenic designers
Purism
Czech Technical University in Prague alumni
1892 births

1936 deaths
1936 suicides
Suicides in Czechoslovakia

Suicides in the Czech Republic
People from Dobrovice